Free Tibet, or Free Tibet Campaign, is a non-profit, non-governmental organization based in London, England.

Free Tibet may also refer to:
 Tibetan independence movement, a movement for the independence of the lands where Tibetan people live 
Tibetan Youth Congress
 Students for a Free Tibet
 Tibetan Freedom Concert, (1996-2012)
International Campaign for Tibet
 Free Tibet (album), a 2006 album by Death In June